Ivan Zhostkin (born 8 May 1991) is a Belarusian professional footballer who plays for Lokomotiv Gomel.

References

External links 
 
 

1991 births
Living people
Belarusian footballers
Association football midfielders
FC Gomel players
FC DSK Gomel players
FC Khimik Svetlogorsk players
FC Rechitsa-2014 players
FC Lokomotiv Gomel players
FC Belshina Bobruisk players
FC Dnepr Mogilev players